Kenneth Parker (born 12 April 1945) is a New Zealand former cricketer. He played one first-class match for Auckland in 1970/71.

See also
 List of Auckland representative cricketers

References

External links
 

1945 births
Living people
Auckland cricketers
Cricketers from Dannevirke
New Zealand cricketers